Fearless is the second solo (and fourth overall) studio album by German singer Nina Hagen. It was released in November 1983 by CBS Records. The German version of the album entitled Angstlos was also released. Produced by Giorgio Moroder and Keith Forsey, the album was a major musical departure from her previous mostly new wave material. Unlike her experimental album NunSexMonkRock (1982), Fearless is a dance-pop album with influence of disco. It also incorporates other genres such as hip hop.

Upon its release, Fearless received generally mixed reviews from music critics. While some praised her new musical direction, others were critical towards her newly adopted disco sound. Commercially, the album noted a moderate success. It was Hagen's second album to chart in the United States, where it peaked at number 151 on the Billboard 200. In Germany, it reached number twenty-four and also charted in other countries, such as Austria, Netherlands, and New Zealand.

Two singles from the album were released. The lead single "New York New York" was successful in American dance charts, peaking at number nine on the Billboard Hot Dance Club Songs. "Zarah", a cover of Zarah Leander's song "Ich weiss, es wird einmal ein Wunder geschehen", was released as the album's second single. It was also successful in the United States where it peaked at number forty-five on the Dance Club Songs chart.

Track listing

Personnel

 Nina Hagen – vocals
 Giorgio Moroder – production
 Keith Forsey – production
 Karl Rucker – bass, keyboards, arrangements
 Steve Schiff – guitar, keyboards, arrangements
 Richie Zito – guitar
 Arthur Barrow – keyboards
 Phil Scanel – keyboards
 Gary Herbig – horns
 Carmen Twillie – backing vocals
 Clydene Jackson – backing vocals
 Julia Waters – backing vocals
 Maxine Waters – backing vocals

 John Gilston – Simmons drum programming
 Vlado Meller – mastering
 Brian Reeves – engineer
 David Concors – engineer
 Richard McKernan – engineer
 Glenn Feit – engineer
 Marva Marrow – photography
 Juliana Grigorova – photography

Charts

References

External links
 [ Fearless] at AllMusic
 

1983 albums
Nina Hagen albums
Albums produced by Giorgio Moroder
Albums produced by Keith Forsey
CBS Records albums